The SNCAC NC.510 was a twin-engine French reconnaissance, army co-operation or advanced training aircraft, built in the late 1930s. Three were built and refined but production orders were not forthcoming.

Design and development

The Société Nationale de Constructions Aéronautique du Centre (SNCAC) was formed via 1936 legislation in February 1937 as a nationalised merging of the Farman and Hanriot companies, in whose design offices several SNCAC types began.  Thus the NC.510 was often referred to as the Hanriot 510 or Hanriot NC.510.

The NC.510 was designed for army co-operation work and as an advanced training aircraft. It was a twin-engined mid-wing monoplane.  Between the engines and fuselage the wing was rectangular in plan and externally braced; the outboard panels were tapered cantilevers.  The wings were built around two metal spars and the centre section was all metal, with metal ribs and skinning.  Outboard their construction was mixed, with wooden ribs and a mixture of metal and fabric covering. Split flaps were fitted.

The fuselage consisted of two sections, both rounded in cross-section.  The forward part, including the enclosed cockpit where the pilot was seated forward of the wing leading edge and an observer, provided with dual controls, behind him, was spruce framed and plywood covered. The observer could also access a long, rectangularly framed, largely transparent, ventral observation structure. The rear fuselage section was also spruce-framed but internally wire-braced and fabric-covered. A rear-facing glazed enclosure over the wing trailing edge held the rear gunner/radio operator.  A transverse metal structure within the fuselage connected it to the two pairs of wing struts.  There was another metal frame aft for mounting the empennage, a braced wooden structure mounted on top of the fuselage.  The tailplane had significant dihedral and carried twin oval fins and rudders. Its fixed surfaces were plywood-covered; the elevators and rudders were fabric-covered with mass and aerodynamically balances.  The rudders had trim tabs.  The NC.510 had a fixed, conventional undercarriage with vertical, oleo shock absorber legs attached to the forward wing spar just inside the engines, braced with a strut to the rear spar.  Legs and wheels were enclosed in fairings, and there was a sprung tail skid. The aircraft carried three machine guns, one fixed in the nose and one moveable in each of the rear dorsal and the ventral positions.  There were racks for flares and for phosphorus bombs in addition to a mixture of handheld and remotely operated cameras for reconnaissance.

The NC.510 first flew on 20 June 1938, powered by two  Gnome-Rhône 9Kfr 9-cylinder air-cooled radials driving two-blade, wooden, fixed-pitch propellers. By December that year it was on display at the Paris Aero Salon with 14-cylinder  Gnome-Rhône 14M double-row radial engines and three-blade propellers. The cleaned-up version first flew with its new engines on 14 January 1939 and was designated the NC.510M.

A final version, the NC.530, was further aerodynamically cleaned and speeded, chiefly by the removal of the ventral gondola. It first flew on 28 June 1939. Two were completed but no production order was won.

Variants

NC.510 9-cylinder,  Gnome-Rhône 9Kfr radial engines. One only.
NC.510M 14-cylinder  Gnome-Rhône 14M radial engines. NC.510 modified, first flew 14 January 1939.
NC.530 Modified fuselage without ventral pod; engines as NC.510M. First flew 28 June 1939. Two built.

Specifications (NC.510)

References

050
1930s French military aircraft
French patrol aircraft
Mid-wing aircraft
Aircraft first flown in 1938
Twin piston-engined tractor aircraft